Kariz (also Romanized as Kārīz, Kahrīz, and Kārez) is a city in Taybad County, Razavi Khorasan Province, Iran. At the 2006 census, its population was 9,565, in 1,988 families.

References 

Populated places in Taybad County
Cities in Razavi Khorasan Province